Apples is the bestselling debut novel by Richard Milward, published in 2007. The novel was adapted into a play, by John Rettallack.

Plot summary 
The book is set in Middlesbrough and follows the stories of teenagers Adam and Eve as they cope with the difficulties of growing up and the complications of friendship. Eve's mother has recently been diagnosed with cancer and as a distraction Eve becomes embroiled in sexual activity and drug taking, whilst Adam tries to cope with sexual frustration, a violent father and increasingly compulsive behaviour.

Structure
The novel is narrated in the first person by several characters and at one point even by a butterfly, although the majority of the stories are narrated by the novel's central protagonists, Adam and Eve.

Critical reception
Apples has received positive reviews from critics upon its release with the BBC review of the book stating that "Milward’s excellent debut finds poetry in his characters’ lives without romanticising their situation.".

References

2007 British novels
2007 debut novels
Faber and Faber books
Middlesbrough
Novels set in Yorkshire